Red Hill Pass may refer to:

Red Hill Pass (Arizona), United States
Red Hill Pass (Colorado), United States
Red Hill Pass (Eastern Cape pass), South Africa